ASCT may refer to: 
Agitated saline contrast test, which goes to Contrast-enhanced ultrasound 
American Society for Cytotechnology 
Autologous stem cell transplantation
Allogeneic stem cell transplantation